United States Team Handball Federation was the governing body for handball in the United States from 1959 until 2006. The successor USA Team Handball is funded in part by the U.S. Olympic & Paralympic Committee in 2008.

United States Team Handball Federation organized the participation of U.S. national teams in international competitions, such as the Summer Olympics and the Pan American Games.

List of presidents
The first president was elected in 1959.

See also
 USA Team Handball
 Handball in the United States

References

External links
 USA Team Handball — Official site

Handball in the United States
Handball
United States 1